A Parisian Scandal is a 1921 American silent comedy-drama film, directed by George L. Cox. It stars George Periolat, Lillian Lawrence, and Marie Prevost, and was released on December 5, 1921.

Plot
As described in a film magazine, Liane-Demarest (Prevost), an American girl raised in France and the only daughter of doting parents, has many suitors. She becomes deeply interested in Basil Hammond (Gallery), a studious young American sent by Liane's grandmother to find out what kind of girl she is. Liane goes into his room at night, destroys his notebook, and pleads with him to be her friend. Thinking that he may have compromised her reputation, he offers to marry her. However, Liane follows the wishes of her parents and becomes engaged to Baron Stransky (Grassby). At a casino Basil and the baron meet, and later, taking shelter from a storm at a roadhouse, they meet again, and Basil administers a good beating to the baron. The baron challenges him to a duel, and Basil accepts, not knowing that the baron is a crack shot. Basil is saved at the duel when Liane declares her love for the baron. Basil then leaves for the United States on a passenger liner where he finds Liane aboard, having registered as Mrs. Basil Hammond. They are then happily married by the ship's captain.

Cast list
 George Periolat as Count Louis Oudoff
 Lillian Lawrence as Countess Oudoff
 Marie Prevost as Liane-Demarest
 Bertram Grassby as Baron Stransky
 George Fisher as Emile Carret
 Lillian Rambeau as Sophie Demarest
 Tom Gallery as Basil Hammond
 Mae Busch as Mamselle Sari
 Rose Dione as Princess

References

External links

1921 comedy-drama films
1920s English-language films
American silent feature films
American black-and-white films
Universal Pictures films
1921 films
1920s American films
Silent American comedy-drama films